The Calling is the ninth studio album released from country music singer Mary Chapin Carpenter. It is the follow-up album to her 2004 album, Between Here and Gone. The Calling was released on March 6, 2007 on Zoë Records. Carpenter had previously been on Columbia Nashville, this being her first release after leaving Columbia. Like her previous album, she wrote every track on the album.

From the album, two singles were released. "On With the Song" and "It Must Have Happened", were released, but neither of which charted on the Billboard Hot Country Songs. Although Carpenter hasn't had a charting single since 2001s "Simple Life", The Calling reached its peak of #10 on the Billboard Top Country Albums chart.

Reception 

Thom Jurek of Allmusic said "Time will tell, of course, but in The Calling, Carpenter may have her finest moment yet; it also feels like an artistic rebirth. These songs come from her marrow and the conviction she sings them with proves it. Carpenter and her co-producer Matt Rollings should be awfully proud of this one." The album was also given 4 stars out of 5.

Track listing 
All songs written by Mary Chapin Carpenter.
 "The Calling" - 4:17  
 "We're All Right"  - 3:47  
 "Twilight" - 4:30  
 "It Must Have Happened" - 4:05
 "On and on It Goes" - 4:20  
 "Your Life Story" - 4:20  
 "Houston" - 5:45 
 "Leaving Song" - 4:02  
 "On With the Song" - 3:58  
 "Closer and Closer Apart" - 4:31 
 "Here I Am" - 4:17  
 "Why Shouldn't We" - 5:04  
 "Bright Morning Star" - 4:55

Production 
 Mary Chapin Carpenter, Matt Rollings - producers
 Chuck Ainlay - engineer, mixing
 Scott Kidd - engineer
 Bob Ludwig - mastering

Personnel 
 Mary Chapin Carpenter - vocals, acoustic guitar
 Eric Darken - percussion, vibraphone
 John Jennings - dulcimer, electric guitar, baritone guitar, background vocals
 Russ Kunkel - drums, percussion, cajon
 Dean Parks - electric guitar, acoustic guitar, 12-string guitar
 Matt Rollings - Hammond organ, piano, accordion
 Glenn Worf - bass guitar

Chart performance

Album

Singles 
All singles failed to chart

References

External links 

Mary Chapin Carpenter albums
2007 albums
Zoë Records albums
Albums produced by Matt Rollings